Morgan County is a county located in the central portion of the U.S. state of Missouri. As of the 2010 census, the population was 20,565. Its county seat is Versailles. The county was organized January 5, 1833 and named for General Daniel Morgan of the American Revolutionary War.

History
Morgan County was organized in 1833 upon separation from Cooper County. It is named in honor of Revolutionary War General Daniel Morgan. Versailles, with a name referring to the French royal estate near Paris, France, was designated as the county seat and platted in 1854.

Established in 1853 there, the Martin Hotel was visited in the post-Civil War period by both showman and circus entrepreneur P. T. Barnum and outlaw robber Jesse James. Listed on the National Register of Historic Places (NRHP) in 1978, it now operates as a museum. In 1858 the Mulhollen Station was a mail stop here for the newly established Butterfield Overland Mail stagecoach line, which carried goods and mail for several years to San Francisco, California.  

The Morgan County Courthouse in Versailles, which has also been listed on the NRHP, was designed with French-style details, such as a mansard roof, in keeping with the origin of the town's name. It burned in 1887. The majority of the records were rescued, and the courthouse was soon rebuilt and restored.

Coal mining was historically an important economic activity in Morgan County.

Geography

Adjacent counties
Cooper County (north)
Moniteau County (northeast)
Miller County (southeast)
Camden County (south)
Benton County (west)
Pettis County (northwest)

Major highways
 U.S. Route 50
 Route 5
 Route 52
 Route 135

Geographical features
Brewner Hollow
Sawmill Hollow

Demographics

As of the census of 2007, there were 20,820 people, over 7,850 households, and over 5,549 families residing in the county.  The population density was 32 people per square mile (12/km2).  There were 13,898 housing units at an average density of 23 per square mile (9/km2).  The racial makeup of the county was 97.34% White, 0.51% Black or African American, 0.63% Native American, 0.12% Asian, 0.02% Pacific Islander, 0.16% from other races, and 1.22% from two or more races. Approximately 0.83% of the population were Hispanic or Latino of any race.

There were 7,850 households, out of which 26.60% had children under the age of 18 living with them, 60.50% were married couples living together, 7.10% had a female householder with no husband present, and 29.30% were non-families. 25.10% of all households were made up of individuals, and 11.90% had someone living alone who was 65 years of age or older.  The average household size was 2.42 and the average family size was 2.88.

In the county, the population was spread out, with 23.80% under the age of 18, 6.20% from 18 to 24, 23.10% from 25 to 44, 27.30% from 45 to 64, and 19.60% who were 65 years of age or older.  The median age was 43 years. For every 100 females there were 97.20 males.  For every 100 females age 18 and over, there were 95.00 males.

The median income for a household in the county was $30,659, and the median income for a family was $35,908. Males had a median income of $26,579 versus $19,072 for females. The per capita income for the county was $15,950.  About 12.10% of families and 16.20% of the population were below the poverty line, including 25.60% of those under age 18 and 9.70% of those age 65 or over.

2020 Census

Education

Public schools
Morgan County R-I School District – Stover
Morgan County R-I Elementary School (PK-04)
Morgan County R-I Middle School (05-08)
Morgan County R-I High School (09-12)
Morgan County R-II School District – Versailles
Morgan County R-II Elementary School (PK-05)
Morgan County R-II South Elementary School (PK-02)
Morgan County R-II Middle School (06-08)
Morgan County R-II High School (09-12)

Private schools
Dogwood Grove School – Versailles (02-09) – Mennonite
St. Paul Lutheran School – Stover (K-09) – Lutheran

Public libraries
Morgan County Library

Politics

Local
The Republican Party controls politics at the local level in Morgan County. Republicans hold all but five of the elected positions in the county.

State

All of Morgan County is in Missouri's 58th Representative District in the Missouri House of Representatives, represented by David Wood (R-Versailles).

 

All of Morgan County is a part of Missouri's 6th District in the Missouri Senate and is currently represented by Mike Kehoe (R-Jefferson City).

Federal

All of Morgan County is included in Missouri's 4th Congressional District and is currently represented by Vicky Hartzler (R-Harrisonville) in the U.S. House of Representatives.

Communities

Cities and towns

Barnett
Gravois Mills
Laurie
Rocky Mount
Stover
Syracuse
Versailles (county seat)

Townships
Buffalo Township
Haw Creek Township
Mill Creek Township
Moreau Township
Osage Township
Richland Township

Unincorporated communities

 Aikinsville
 Boylers Mill
 Buck Creek
 Excelsior
 Florence
 Glensted
 Marvin
 Proctor
 Pyrmont
 Riverview
 Rocky Mount

See also
National Register of Historic Places listings in Morgan County, Missouri

References

Further reading
 History of Cole, Moniteau, Morgan, Benton, Miller, Maries and Osage counties, Missouri : from the earliest time to the present, including a department devoted to the preservation of sundry personal, business, professional and the private records; besides a valuable fund of notes, original observations, etc. etc. (1889) online

External links
 Digitized 1930 Plat Book of Morgan County  from University of Missouri Division of Special Collections, Archives, and Rare Books
 Morgan County Sheriff's Office

 
1833 establishments in Missouri
Populated places established in 1833